Edmund Uvedale may refer to:

Edmund Uvedale (died 1606), MP for Dorset
Edmund Uvedale (died 1621), MP for Corfe Castle